Jack Gordon may refer to:

Government
Jack Gordon (Mississippi politician) (1944–2011), American politician in Mississippi
John F. (Jack) Gordon (1921–2010), American civic promoter in Seattle
Jack Murphy Gordon (1931–1982), U.S. federal judge

Sports
Jack Gordon (footballer, born 1863) (1861–1941), Scottish footballer (Preston North End)
Jack Gordon (footballer, born 1899) (1899–1964), Scottish footballer (Port Vale, Luton Town)
Jack Gordon (footballer, born 1911) (1911–?), English footballer for Rochdale A.F.C
Jack Gordon (ice hockey) (1928–2022), Canadian ice hockey coach

Others
Jack Gordon (entertainment manager) (1939–2005), American former manager and husband of singer La Toya Jackson
Jack Gordon (Peter Worthington) (1822–1864), American renegade, soldier, and outlaw (also known as "Apache Jack" Gordon)
Jack Gordon (actor), English actor

See also
John Gordon (disambiguation)